ValueAct Capital is a San Francisco-based investment company with a portfolio value calculated at about $9.269 billion on behalf of several institutional and individual investors. The company is a privately owned hedge fund that invests in the public equity markets.

Background 
ValueAct Capital was initially formed in June 2000 to manage the capital of its founders, along with the capital of a limited number of outside investors.

Investor actions 
ValueAct Capital is a very active investor that identifies companies that appear to be out of favor or may be undergoing a significant transition. ValueAct makes a significant investment into the company and then works with the company to make changes with the goal of increasing long-term stock value and thus creating a profit for ValueAct.

Rolls-Royce 
In August 2020, the company sold all of the stake capital of Rolls-Royce.

Microsoft 
In May 2013 ValueAct Capital revealed that it had purchased $2 billion worth of Microsoft stock (less than 1%). Shortly thereafter the company made public announcements that it sought to join the board of Microsoft if the company did not increase its stock price through a stock buyback program or a larger dividend. The threat was seen as one of the reasons that Steve Ballmer decided to leave Microsoft.

The New York Times Company 
ValueAct disclosed a 7% stake in The New York Times Company in August 2022. ValueAct aims to encourage the company to more actively pursue the sale of "bundled" subscriptions to its various offerings.

Salesforce 
ValueAct disclosed a multi billion stake in Salesforce in January 2022. On January 27th, Salesforce announced that it is appointing three new directors to the board, one of whom is Mason Morfit, CEO and CIO of ValueAct Capital.

References

External links

Hedge fund firms in California
Financial services companies established in 2000
Companies based in San Francisco